Brian Borcherdt (born August 31, 1976) is a Canadian musician who has been both a solo artist and a member of Burnt Black, Trephines, Hot Carl, By Divine Right, Holy Fuck, Lids, and Dusted.

As a teenager growing up in Yarmouth, Nova Scotia, he founded independent music collective and record label Dependent Music.

Chipmunks on 16 Speed 
Chipmunks on 16 Speed or Chipmunkson16speed (stylized in lower case) is a 2015 musical project by Brian Borcherdt, in which he plays various Alvin and the Chipmunks songs and covers on vinyl, and slows them down to 16 revolutions per minute, slow enough that the vocals no longer sound sped up. Most of the songs come from The Chipmunks album Chipmunk Punk, and the album covers for the project are also adapted from its cover art.

Borcherdt's work has been described as gothic rock, new wave, and post-punk, or a combination between sludge metal and pop, while Borcherdt himself described it as "heavy", "beautiful", and "poetic". A SoundCloud playlist made for the project, titled Sludgefest, was reuploaded to YouTube and now has over 3 million views.

Borcherdt had discovered the concept as he began to play with Holy Fuck, after experimenting with the records on a turntable, and then found a suitcase turntable that could play at extremely slow speeds.

Discography

Solo albums

The Remains of Brian Borcherdt 
 Moth (2002)
 The Remains of Brian Borcherdt (2003)
 The Remains of..., Volume 2 (2004)
 Torches/ Ward Colorado Demos (unfinished recordings from 2005 to 2006)

Brian Borcherdt 
 Coyotes (2008)

Chipmunks on 16 Speed 

 Vol. 1 (2015)
 Vol. 2 (2015)

Collaborative albums

Burnt Black 
Happy (1994)
Nervous Wreck (1996)
A Demonstration (1997)
Burned out (1999)

Trephines 
Trephines (2001)

By Divine Right 
 Sweet Confusion (2004)

Holy Fuck 
 Holy Fuck (2005)
 Holy Fuck EP (2007)
 LP (2007)
 Latin (2010)
 Congrats (2016)
 Deleter (2020)

Dusted 
 Total Dust (2012)
 Blackout Summer (2018)
 III (2021)

References

External links
 Record label website
 City Sonic: Holy Fuck Film
 An interview with Brian Borcherdt: Holy Fuck, he’s totally Dusted! September 14, 2012

1976 births
Canadian indie rock musicians
Canadian rock singers
Canadian rock guitarists
Canadian male guitarists
Canadian singer-songwriters
Living people
People from Yarmouth, Nova Scotia
By Divine Right members
21st-century Canadian guitarists
21st-century Canadian male singers
Canadian male singer-songwriters